Elections to Stevenage Borough Council took place on 5 May 2022. This was on the same day as other local elections across the United Kingdom. One third of the council was up for election; the seats which were last contested in 2018. The Labour Party retained control of the council, which it has held continuously since its creation in 1973.

Results summary

Ward results

Bandley Hill

Bedwell

Chells

Longmeadow

Manor

Martins Wood

Old Town

Pin Green

Roebuck

Shephall

St. Nicholas

Symonds Green

Woodfield

By-elections

Bedwell

References

2022
Stevenage
May 2022 events in the United Kingdom
2020s in Hertfordshire